Marcus Tyrone Gray (born September 16, 1981), known as Flame (often stylized in all caps), is an American Lutheran Christian hip hop rapper with Clear Sight Music. He has released nine albums. Flame has been nominated for several Dove and Stellar Awards. The Our World: Redeemed album was nominated for a Grammy Award.

Biography

As of 2005, Flame sold over 35,000 albums, and one of his interludes from his first album was played on Busch Stadium's loudspeakers every time Albert Pujols came to bat.

On February 20, 2007, it was announced that Flame's track, "Gotta Notice", from the album Rewind was nominated for the 38th Annual GMA Dove Awards in the category Rap/Hip Hop Recorded Song of the Year. In mid-2007, Flame joined the rest of Cross Movement for their final tour. Our World Redeemed was nominated for a Stellar Award, Dove Award, and Grammy Award. In 2009, Flame was a special guest on Reach Records 116 Clique's tour Don't Waste Your Life.

In 2010, Flame announced a new album titled Captured.

In 2014 Flame, along with three other musicians, filed a lawsuit against Katy Perry for alleged copyright infringement. In the suit, Perry was accused of stealing production elements from Flame's gospel track "Joyful Noise", in her song "Dark Horse". Flame and the other plaintiffs involved in the suit claimed that, not only did Perry use appropriate elements of the song, but that the video tarnished their production by using imagery associated with black magic and witchcraft, ideologies that Flame strongly opposes. It was originally reported that the matter had been settled out of court; however, as of late 2018, the case was set to go to trial. On July 29, 2019, a jury sided with Flame, leaving Perry to pay $550,000 and her label to pay the remaining $2.78 million. On March 17, 2020, Judge Christina A. Snyder overturned the jury award, citing numerous factors, including that the musical theme was both simple and common, and that the evidence given did not support the jury's award. Snyder vacated the jury's verdict and denied motions for a new trial, but stated that, should the case be heard on appeal at the Ninth Circuit, a new jury trial would be required. Flame filed a notice of appeal at the Ninth Circuit on April 13, 2020. In March 2022, the Ninth Circuit ruled in Perry's favor, upholding the vacation ruling from the District Court. The courts found the ostinatos in question unrelated, failed to meet the threshold of originality required for protection, and granted JMOL to defendants.

In March 2020, Flame left the Reformed tradition and was received into the Lutheran Church. His EP Christ for You focuses on the Lutheran belief in the real presence of Christ in the Eucharist, citing the Church Fathers such as Justin Martyr, Augustine of Hippo, Irenaeus, Cyril and Thomas Aquinas (cf. Eucharist in Lutheranism). Reflecting on his Lutheran Christian faith, Flame rejoiced: "It wasn't until I stumbled upon Lutheran thought that I discovered the treasure found in the liturgical and sacramental side of things." He praised the Lutheran tradition for its "ancient truths that will comfort contemporary consciences" and said that those "Truths that will bring people out of their heads and lift their heads from navel-gazing onto the sweet means of grace that God has provided outside of us." Flame named his album Christ for You as he wants his fans "to experience the joy and freedom that I’ve found in the sacraments." (cf. Lutheran sacraments)

Education 
Marcus Gray earned his Master of Arts degree from Concordia Seminary in Systematic Theology, with minors in Church History, as well as Counseling.

Discography

Studio albums

References

External links
 Flame314: Discipling from a Distance
 Flame Interview with Rapzilla
 

1981 births
African-American Christians
African-American male rappers
African-American poets
American evangelicals
Cross Movement Records
Living people
American performers of Christian hip hop music
Rappers from St. Louis
Southern Baptist Theological Seminary alumni
Musicians from Louisville, Kentucky
Rappers from Kentucky
21st-century American rappers
21st-century American poets
21st-century American male musicians
American Lutherans
21st-century African-American musicians
20th-century African-American people